Wauponsee is an unincorporated community in Vienna Township, Grundy County, Illinois, United States.

References

Unincorporated communities in Illinois
Unincorporated communities in Grundy County, Illinois